Al Muttahed also known by its name United Club Tripoli is a Lebanese sports club most known for its basketball program playing in top division for men and women. It is located Tripoli, Lebanon. It is affiliated with Safadi Foundation but has its own independent administrative structure.
Tripoli's Al-Mouttahed club was founded in 2001 with the objective of promoting the development of sports in Tripoli and in North Lebanon to strengthen the presence of Tripoli in the Lebanese sports life and to breathe new life into the game of Basketball.
Al Muttahed Tripoli basketball team is part of the Lebanese Basketball League 1st division and presently the only team from the North Governorate.

Description 

Tripoli's Al-Mouttahed club was founded in 2001.

Achievements 
 Champion of the 2004 John Hamam Basketball Championship
 Runner up in the 2007/2008 First Division Championship
 Lebanese basketball Regular League Championship in 2008/2009
 Lebanese Basketball runner-up in 2008-2009
 Runner-up of Arab Club Championship in 2009/2010

Current squad

References

Basketball teams in Lebanon
Basketball teams established in 2001
2001 establishments in Lebanon
Tripoli, Lebanon